Gymnopilus angustifolius is a species of mushroom-forming fungus in the family Hymenogastraceae.

Description

See also

 List of Gymnopilus species

References

angustifolius
Fungi of North America
Fungi described in 1969
Taxa named by Lexemuel Ray Hesler